Wilfred Richard Daniel Payton (3 February 1882 – 2 May 1943) was an English first-class cricketer who played for Nottinghamshire County Cricket Club. 

Payton was a right-handed middle order batsman and made 39 hundreds, his first was an innings of 133 against the touring West Indians in 1906. He topped 1000 runs per season every year from 1921 to 1929 with a best of 1864 runs at 47.79 in 1926. His only first-class wicket was Northamptonshire's Bernard Atkinson.

Payton's son, also named Wilfred, followed in his footsteps and played with Nottinghamshire in 1935.

References

1882 births
1943 deaths
English cricketers
Nottinghamshire cricketers